is a Tokyo-born Japanese writer, composer, and film director. In his film and singing work he uses the name Jinsei Tsuji, an alternative reading of the Japanese writing of his name. He debuted as a writer in 1989. His books and stories have been bestsellers in Japan as well as overseas, with his work being translated into 20 languages and selling over ten million copies.

His books Calmi Cuori Appassionati Blu (1999) and Good Bye See You Someday (2001).

He launched the web magazine Design Stories and became its chief editor in October 2016.

Personal life 
Tsuji was born in Tokyo in 1959. He debuted as a vocalist of the rock band ECHOS in 1985 and the original song "ZOO" reached over a million sales.

He was a professor at Kyoto University of Art and Design from 2007 to 2016.

Tsuji was married to actress Kaho Minami from 1995 to 2000. He married singer and actress Miho Nakayama in 2002 and they moved to Paris, France, before she gave birth to their son a year later. They divorced in 2014, and Nakayama moved back to Japan, with Tsuji retaining custody of their son.

Career

As a novelist
During the 1980s, Tsuji started seriously writing novels as a “Blank Generation” writer.

In 1989, his first novel, Pianissimo, won the 13th Subaru Prize for Literature (Subaru Bungaku Sho).

In 1997, he was awarded the 116th Akutagawa Prize for Kaikyo no Hikari (The Light from the Straits).

In 1999, he was awarded the Prix Femina Award, a prestigious French literary prize, in the foreign novel category, for the French translation of Le Boudda blanc (The White Buddha, or Hakubutsu, published by Mercure de France). He is the first Japanese writer to ever win the Prix Femina Award.

In 2003, his seven short stories were published in the French literary magazine Je Bouquine.

In 2005, he was selected by French literary magazine LIRE as one of the world’s 50 prospective novelists.

In 2005, his serial novel was featured in the South Korean newspaper The Hankyoreh. Tsuji is the first Japanese native novelist to have his work published in The Hankyoreh.

In 2011, Tsuji wrote a children’s book called In Rapet’s World dedicated to children who were struck by the 2011 Tōhoku earthquake.

As a film director
In the 1980s, Tsuji started producing independent films through his college’s movie club.

In 1999, his directorial debut, Sennen-Tabito (for which he did the direction, screenwriting, and music) was presented as an official invitation film for the 56th International Critic week of the Venice Film Festival.

In 2001, his movie Hotoke (director, writer, and music) was presented as an official selection in the 51st Berlin International Film Festival, in the Panorama section. In the same year, Hotoke was presented to the Deauville Asian Film Festival, in the Competition section, and won best image award. The film was featured in the 27th Seattle International Film Festival.

In 2002, his movie Filament (director, screenwriter, music) was submitted to the 37th Czech Karlovy Vary International Film Festival in the Official Selection Competition section and awarded the International Ecumenical Jury of the Christian Churches.

Tsuji also wrote and directed a TV movie titled Mokka no Koibito in 2002.

In summer 2008, his other movie Acacia was produced; it was presented at the 22nd Tokyo International Film Festival in the Competition section in 2009.

In 2010, his movie Paris Tokyo Paysage was produced and submitted to the 7th Festival du cinéma japonais contemporain Kinotayo (2012-2013) and awarded the Prix de la meilleure image (best cinematography).

Works

Novels (Japanese edition)
 Pianissimo (1990)
 Cloudy (1990)
 Kai no Omochyabako (1991)
 Tabibito no Ki (1992)
 Fragile (1992)
 Glasswool no Shiro (1993)
 Hahanaru Nagi to Chichinaru Zika (1994)
 Open house (1994)
 Ai ha Pride yori tsuyoku (1995)
 Passagio (1995)
 Sabita Sekai no Guidebook (1995)
 Newton no Ringo (1996)
 Antinoise (1996)
 Kyō no Kimochi (1996)
 Kaikyō no Hikari (1997)
 Ai no Kumen (1997)
 Hakufutsu (1997)
 Wild Flower (1998)
 Sennenn Tabibito (1999)
 Reisei to Zyonetu no Aida Blue (1999)
 Shitto no Kaori (2000)
 Ai wo kudasai (2000)
 Sayonara Itsuka (2001)
 Koisuru tame ni umareta (2001)
 Taiyō Machi (2001)
 Mokka no Koibito (2002)
 Ai to Eien no Aoisora (2002)
 Kanojo wa Uchyūfuku wo kitenemuru (2002)
 O'keeffe no Koibito Ozwald no Tsuioku (2003)
 99sai made ikita Akanbō (2003)
 Ima Kono Syunkan Aishiterutoiukoto (2003)
 Katana (2004)
 Daihitsy Ya (2004)
 Koufuku na Ketsumatsu (2005)
 Acacia Ashita no Yakusoku (2005)
 Yada to Iiyo (2005)
 Ai no atoni Kurumono (2006)
 Pianissimo Pianissimo (2007)
 Hito ha Omoide ni nomi shittosuru (2007)
 Ugan (2008)
 Madam to Okusama (2009)
 Mokka no Koibito (2009)
 Dahlia (2009)
 Acacia no Hana no sakidasukoro Acacia (2009)
 Kuroe to Enzō (2010)
 Get Far Away from Me (2011)
 Eiensha (2012)
 Mistake (2012)
 Two People in the Future (2013) *Original novel of the movie “Two People in the Future”
 The Unfading Dream We Have (2014) *Original novel of the movie “The Unfading Dream We Have”
 The Date Line (1st and 2nd volume) (2015)

Novels (English edition)
 Pianissimo by Hitonari Tsuji, translated by Rebecca Clare Lindsay, Shueisha Inc. 1992

Films (Japanese edition)
 Sennen-Tabito (1999)
 Hotoke (2001)
 Filament (2002)
 Acacia (2008)
 Tokyo Paris Paysage (2010)
 Tokyo Decibels (2015)

Awards

Novels 
 1989 — Subaru Literary Prize (Shueisha), Pianissimo
 1996 — Akutagawa Prize, The Light from the Strait (Kaikyō no hikari)
 1999 — Femina Prize (Prix Femina Étranger), Le Bouddha blanc (The White Buddha, 白仏)

Films 
 2001 - Hotoke, won best image award in the Competition section at the Deauville Asian Film Festival
 2002 - Filament (Director, Screenwriter, Music), awarded the International Ecumenical Jury of the Christian Churches in the Official Selection Competition section at the 37th Czech Karlovy Vary International Film Festival 
 2008 - Acacia, presented to the 22nd Tokyo international Film Festival
 2013 - Paris Tokyo Paysage, awarded the Prix de la meilleure image (best cinematography) at the 7th Festival du cinéma japonais contemporain Kinotayo (2012-2013)

References

Sources 
 Writer information page in his short story collection . Tokyo: Kōbunsha, 2002. .

External links 

 
 
 
 Hitonari Tsuji at J'Lit Books from Japan 

1959 births
Japanese expatriates in France
Japanese film directors
Japanese lyricists
Japanese male composers
20th-century Japanese novelists
21st-century Japanese novelists
Living people
People from Hino, Tokyo
Prix Femina Étranger winners
Akutagawa Prize winners
20th-century Japanese composers
21st-century Japanese composers
20th-century Japanese male singers
20th-century Japanese singers
21st-century Japanese male singers
21st-century Japanese singers